Uzalo is a South African soap opera produced by Stained Glass Productions, which is co-owned by Kobedi "Pepsi" Pokane and Gugu Zuma-Ncube. It began airing in 2015, quickly becoming a hit due to its compelling narrative, writing, direction and the performances of the relatively-unknown cast. It initially told the story of two young men who were switched at birth, one being raised in a family with core Christian values and the other at a crime syndicate. It currently broadcasts from Monday to Friday on SABC 1. It is currently the most watched television show in South Africa.

Plot
Uzalo initially told the story of two families in the township of Kwa-Mashu: the Mdletshe family, who play a significant role in the management of the Kwamashu Kingdom Church, and the Xulu family who run a car theft syndicate. The connection between the families was that their eldest sons were switched at birth during the period when Nelson Mandela was released from prison. As the show has progressed over the years, the storylines have dramatically changed with interchanging characters, contributing to many new story arcs, but simultaneously maintaining the growth of some of its main and supporting characters.

Cast

Ratings
<onlyinclude>

Series 1 (2015)

Series 4 (2018)

<onlyinclude>

Cast and characters
 Lindiwe "Mangcobo" Xulu, played by Dawn Thandeka King. She has a daughter named Nosipho and is ex husband of Gxabhashe, Khathaza. She killed khathaza. She was married to Nkunzi. She escaped to Maputo because she had messed with Umbutho, she stays with Mxolisi in Maputo. She is set to be making her return in March 2023 in the 9th season. (Main role: season 1 - 7; Main role: season 9 - present)
Nkunzebomvu (Nkunzi) Mhlongo,  played by Masoja Msiza. He is the ex-husband of Innocentia, MaMlambo and Mazaza.then he married with Lindiwe. He's currently in relationship with Gabisile. He married Gabisile. (Main role: Season 1 - present)
 Nosipho Xulu, played by Nompilo Maphumulo. She is the daughter of Muzi and Mangcobo. She is the sister of Ayanda and half sister to Amandla. She briefly has an affair with Ayanda unaware he is her brother and also has a brief affair with Zweli. She is the ex-girlfriend of Mondli, Njeza and Thulani and Qhabanga’s ex-fiancée. She is currently engaged to Sambulo. She has a child called Muzi. (Main role: Season 1 - 9)
 Hlengiwe (MaMlambo) Mlambo played by Gugu Gumede. She befriends MaNzuza and MaNcgobo and was married to Nkunzebomvu Mhlongo. She also had a relationship with Thobile’s uncle Mbhekiseni but later dumped him after he was arrested for raping Thobile and various younger women. She had affairs with Melusi, Qhabanga and Nkunzi. She came back as a Sangoma. ( Main role. Season 1 - present)
 Fikile Hlatshwayo, played by Nelisa Mchunu. She is Thobile, GC and Smangele's friend and hairdresser. She was in a relationship with Sbu. She had drunken sex with Mxolisi while he was still dating Zekhethelo. She also cheated on Sbu with his boss Nkunzi. She left kwamashu to start a new life. (Main role: Season 1 - 7)
 Zekhethelo Mhlongo, played by Nyalleng Thibedi. She was raised by Nkunzi. Her stepmothers are Innocentia and Lindiwe and her biological mother is called Mapadi, who has been absent throughout her life. She had an on and off relationship with Mxolisi. She was also in a relationship with Njeza. She was a cop and was in a relationship with Mondli. (Main role: Season 1- 6)
 Qhabanga Khumalo, played by Siyabonga Shibe. He was a policeman from Kwa-Mashu police station. He is Nkunzi's younger half-brother. He is Nosipho’s ex-fiancé. He then later married Gabsile but later cheated on her with his brother’s wife MaMlambo. When MaMlambo ended her affair with Qhabanga, he briefly lived with Sbu and Fikile but managed to reunite with Gabsile. However after learning about Gabsile’s affair with his son Khehla, he dumped her and later remarried Khehla’s mother Nomcebo. After Nomcebo was shot dead, he got back together with Gabsile. He later became the pastor of KwaMashu Kingdom Church. He attempted to Kill Gabisile in season 6. (Main role. Season 3 - 6)
 Mondli Mdlalose, played by Thembinkosi Thwala. Mondli is the Head police captain and dated Zekhethelo. He is Nosipho and Lilly's ex-boyfriend. (Main role. Season 1 - present) 
 Gabisile Mdletshe - Mhlongo, played by Baby Cele - Maloka. She is the sister of the Pastor Melusi and Zandile's sister in law. She is the aunt of Mxolisi, Nkosinathi and Mumsy. She is a landlady of a house she owns. Mother of Sbonelo. She is Qhabanga Khumalo's wife. She was killed by Qhabanga. She was saved by a girl called Hlelo.She is in a relationship with Nkunzi. She is married to Nkunzi. (Main role. Season 3  - present)
Sbonelo (Babo) Mhlongo, played by Wiseman Mncube, was a doctor. He resigned after secretly killing Nonka’s close friend Nsizwa. He is also the only son of Nkunzebomvu and Gabisile. He is in love with Nonkanyiso , and later on proposed to her. After they got married, she then later divorced him. ( Main role. Season 5 - present)
Nonkanyiso "Nonka" Xaba, played by Thuthuka Mthembu. She works in the salon and is a good friend of Hleziphi and Fikile and is the ex-wife to Sibonelo. She is Njeza and Mbuso’s sister and Lilly’s cousin. She is MaDongwe’s niece. (Recurring role. Season 5; Main role. Season 6 - present)
Sbusiso (Sbu) played by Simphiwe Majozi is an ex con. He is dating Fikile. He works for Nkunzi and MaNgcobo, and later Sibonelo. (Recurring role. Season 1; Main role. Season 2 - Present)
Njeza, played by Nkanyiso Makhanya. He is an ex con and is the older brother of Nonka and Mbuso. He is Lilly’s cousin and MaDongwe’s nephew. He worked at Khathaza's funeral home. He had a brief relationship with Zekhethelo and was in love with Nosipho, then Nonka's friend Hleziphi. ( Main role. Season 6 - present)
Mr Mbatha,played by William Mnguni. He is part of the board at KwaMashu Kingdom Church. He is formerly the pastor of KwaMashu Kingdom Church and was engaged to Fihliwe. He is also MaMadongwe is ex-husband. (Main role. Season 1 - present)

Cast members 
Season 1
Dawn Thandeka King as Lindiwe Xulu
Leleti Khumalo as Zandile Mdletshe
Nay Maps as Mxolisi Xulu
Khumbulani Sibiya as Ayanda Mdletshe
Mpumelelo Bhulose as Muzi Xulu
Bheki Mkhwane as Melusi Mdletshe 
TK Dlamini as Mastermind Maphumulo
Gugu Gumede as Hlengiwe Mlambo
Nompilo Maphumulo as Nosipho Xulu
Nelisa Mchunu as Fikile Hlatshwayo
Khaya Dladla as GC Cetshwayo
Nokuthula Mabika as Thobile Vazi
Sihle Ndaba as Smangele Maphumulo
Thandeka Zulu as Nombuso
Nyalleng Thibedi as Zekhethelo Mhlongo
Masoja Msiza as Nkunzebomvu Mhlongo
Don Mlangeni Nawa as Dlomo
Thembinkosi Thwala as Mondli Mdlalose
Simphiwe Majozi as Sibusiso Makhathini
Season 2
Dawn Thandeka King as Lindiwe Xulu
Leleti Khumalo as Zandile Mdletshe 
Nay Maps as Mxolisi Mdletshe
Glen Gobela as Melusi Mdletshe 
TK Dlamini as Mastermind Maphumulo 
Gugu Gumede as Hlengiwe Mlambo 
Nompilo Maphumulo as Nosipho Xulu
Sihle Ndaba as Smangele Maphumulo 
Khaya Dladla as GC Cetshwayo
Nelisa Mchunu as Fikile Hlatshwayo
Nokuthula Mabika as Thobile Vazi
Nyaleng Thibedi as Zekhethelo Mhlongo 
Masoja Msiza as Nkunzebomvu Mhlongo 
Thandeka Zulu as Nombuso 
Thembinkosi Thwala as Mondli Mdlalose
Simphiwe Majozi as Sibusiso Makhathini
Bongani Madondo as Amos 
Season 3
Dawn Thandeka King as Lindiwe Mhlongo
Leleti Khumalo as Zandile Mdletshe 
Nay Maps as Mxolisi Xulu 
TK Dlamini as Mastermind Maphumulo 
Glen Gabela as Melusi Mdletshe 
Masoja Msiza as Nkunzebomvu Mhlongo 
Baby Cele as Gabisile Mdletshe
Gugu Gumede as Hlengiwe Mlambo
Nompilo Maphumulo as Nosipho Xulu 
Sihle Ndaba as Smangele Maphumulo
Khaya Dladla as GC Cetshwayo
Nelisa Mchunu as Fikile Hlatshwayo 
Nokuthula Mabika as Thobile Vazi 
Nyalleng Thibedi as Zekhethelo Mhlongo 
Simphiwe Majozi as Sibusiso Makhathini 
Thembinkosi Thwala as Mondli Mdlalose 
Siyabonga Shibe as Qhabanga Khumalo 
Season 4
Dawn Thandeka King as Lindiwe Mhlongo 
Nay Maps as Mxolisi Xulu 
TK Dlamini as Mastermind Maphumulo 
Masoja Msiza as Nkunzebomvu Mhlongo 
Baby Cele - Maloka as Gabisile Khumalo 
Glen Gabela as Melusi Mdletshe 
Gugu Gumede as Hlengiwe Mhlongo
Nompilo Maphumulo as Nosipho Xulu 
Nelisa Mchunu as Fikile Hlatshwayo 
Khaya Dladla as GC Cetshwayo
Nokuthula Mabika as Thobile Vazi 
Nyalleng Thibedi as Zekhethelo Mhlongo 
Simphiwe Majozi as Sibusiso Makhathini
Siyabonga Shibe as Qhabanga Khumalo 
Thembinkosi Thwala as Mondli Mdlalose 
Season 5
 Dawn Thandeka King as Lindiwe Xulu 
 Nay Maps as Mxolisi Xulu 
 TK Dlamini as Mastermind Maphumulo 
 Masoja Msiza as Nkunzebomvu Mhlongo
 Baby Cele - Maloka as Gabisile Khumalo 
 Glen Gabela as Melusi Mdletshe 
 Gugu Gumede as Hlengiwe Mlambo 
 Nelisa Mchunu as Fikile Hlatshwayo 
 Nyalleng Thibedi as Zekhethelo Mhlongo 
 Simphiwe Majozi as Sibusiso Makhathini 
 Siyabonga Shibe as Qhabanga Khumalo 
 Thembinkosi Thwala as Mondli Mdlalose 
 Wiseman Mncube as Dr. Sibonelo Mhlongo 
 Mondli Makhoba as Amos
 Thabo Mnguni as Mr Mbatha
Season 6
Dawn Thandeka King as Lindiwe Khanyile
Masoja Msiza as Nkunzebomvu Mhlongo 
Baby Cele - Maloka as Gabisile Khumalo 
Glen Gabela as Melusi Mdletshe 
Gugu Gumede as Hlengiwe Mlambo 
Wiseman Mncube as Sibonelo Mhlongo 
Nelisa Mchunu as Fikile Hlatshwayo 
Nyalleng Thibedi as Zekhethelo Mhlongo 
Simphiwe Majozi as Sibusiso Makhathini 
Thembinkosi Thwala as Mondli Mdlalose 
Thuthuka Mthembu as Nonkanyiso Xaba
Noxolo Mathula as Lilian "Lilly" Dongwe
Nkanyiso Makhanya as Nkululeko Xaba
Zama Magubane as Balingene Dongwe
Ntombifuthi Dlamini as Gladys Madlala
Siyabonga Shibe as Qhabanga Khumalo 
Nombulelo Mhlongo as Nomcebo Khumalo
Thobani Nzuza as Khehla Khumalo 
Sphelele Mzimela as MaZaza
Thabo Mnguni as Khethukuthula Mbatha
Sibonile Ngubane as Khathaza Khanyile
Thulani Shange as Thulani Khanyile
Lizwe Vilakazi as Godfather Khanyile  
Cebo Mthembu as Khalabemgeza Nyawo 
Season 7
Dawn Thandeka King as Lindiwe Xulu 
Masoja Msiza as Nkunzebomvu Mhlongo 
Baby Cele as Gabisile Mdletshe 
Gugu Gumede as Hlengiwe Mlambo 
Nompilo Maphumulo as Nosipho Xulu 
Wiseman Mncube as Sibonelo Mhlongo 
Menzi Biyela as Pastor Sambulo Gwala
Nelisa Mchunu as Fikile Hlatshwayo 
Simphiwe Majozi as Sibusiso Makhathin
Nothando Ngcobo as Hlelolwenkosi 
Thuthuka Mthembu as Nonkanyiso Xaba
Noxolo Mathula as Lilian "Lilly" Dongwe
Nkanyiso Makhanya as Nkululeko Xaba 
Zama Magubane as Balingene Dongwe 
Ntombifuthi Dlamini as Gladys Madlala
Thabo Mnguni as Khethukuthula Mbatha
Cebo Mthembu as Khalabemgeza Nyawo
Mbali Maphumulo as Wenzile Nhlapo
Season 8
Masoja Msiza as Nkunzebomvu Mhlongo 
Baby Cele - Maloka as Gabisile Mdletshe 
Wiseman Mncube as Sibonelo Mhlongo
Gugu Gumede as Hlengiwe Mlambo 
Nompilo Maphumulo as Nosipho Xulu 
Menzi Brighton Biyela as Sambulo Gwala
Simphiwe Majozi as Sibusiso Makhathini 
Siyabonga Radebe as Vika Magwaza
Thembi Nyandeni as Njinji Magwaza 
Omuhle Gela as Nomaswazi Magwaza 
Buyile Mdladla as Mthambisi Phakathi
Thembinkosi Thwala as Mondli Mdlalose 
Nothando Ngcobo as Hlelolwenkosi
Noxolo Mathula as Officer Lilian Dongwe
Thuthuka Mthembu as Nonkanyiso Xaba 
Nkanyiso Makhanya as Nkululeko Xaba
Zama Magubane as Balingene Dongwe 
Ntombifuthi Dlamini as Gladys Madlala
Thabo Mnguni as Khethukuthula Mbatha
Cebo Mthembu as Khalabemgeza Nyawo
Ronald Mkwanazi as Bab'Ntsimbi Magwaza
Sthembile Mhlongo as Flavia
Season 9

In this season actress Dawn Thandeka King  will be returning to the show as Lindiwe Xulu in this month (March) 2023
Dawn Thandeka King as Lindiwe Xulu
Masoja Msiza as Nkunzebomvu Mhlongo 
Baby Cele - Maloka as Gabisile Mhlongo
Thembi Nyandeni as Njinji Magwaza 
Wiseman Mncube as Sibonelo Mhlongo 
Fanele Ntuli as Nomaswazi Magwaza 
Gugu Gumede as Hlengiwe Mlambo 
Siyabonga Radebe as Vikizitha Magwaza
Simphiwe Majozi as Sibusiso Makhathini 
Thembinkosi Thwala as Mondli Mdlalose 
Nothando Ngcobo as Hlelolwenkosi 
Noxolo Mathula as Lilian Dongwe
Thuthuka Mthembu as Nonkanyiso Xaba 
Nkanyiso Makhanya as Nkululeko Xaba 
Zama Magubane as Balingene Dongwe 
Ntombifuthi Dlamini as Gladys Madlala
Thabo Mnguni as Khethukuthula Mbatha 
Cebo Mthembu as Khalabemgeza Nyawo 
Sthembile Mhlongo as Flavia

Former Cast of  1 - 9

Accolades

References

External links
 

South African television soap operas
Zulu-language television shows